Hristo Georgiev (Bulgarian: Христо Георгиев) was a wealthy Bulgarian, and brother of Evlogi Georgiev, who lived in the 19th century. With his brother he funded the construction of Sofia University in Bulgaria's capital. The university was one of the most important and up to date institutions of the time, with tens of thousands of native and foreign students.

Burials at Bellu Cemetery
People from Karlovo
Bulgarian bankers
Bulgarian expatriates in Romania
Year of birth missing
Year of death missing